Cissites maculata is a species of blister beetle that lives on the Galápagos Islands. They are a brood parasite of Xylocopa darwini, the Galápagos carpenter bee.

References 

Beetles described in 1787
Meloidae